"Just Another Rumba" is a 1937 song composed by George Gershwin with lyrics by Ira Gershwin.

Most likely written for A Damsel in Distress (1937) it was never included in the final production, and although the song went into rehearsal for The Goldwyn Follies (1938), it was never included in the final film.

Notable recordings 
Ella Fitzgerald - Ella Fitzgerald Sings the George and Ira Gershwin Songbook (1959)

Songs with music by George Gershwin
Songs with lyrics by Ira Gershwin
1937 songs